is a Japanese footballer currently playing as a winger for Vegalta Sendai.

Career statistics

Club
.

Notes

References

External links

2002 births
Living people
Japanese footballers
Association football midfielders
Sagan Tosu players